Kathryn Leonard is an American mathematician and computer scientist. Leonard received a Henry L. Alder Award from the Mathematical Association of America in 2012. She received the AWM Service Award from the Association for Women in Mathematics (AWM) in 2015. She served as the AWM Meetings Coordinator from 2015 - 2018. She is President of the AWM as of February 1, 2021. She is also director of the NSF-funded Center for Undergraduate Research in Mathematics.

Leonard's research focuses on geometric modeling with applications to computer vision, computer graphics, and data science. She has received multiple major grants, including a National Science Foundation CAREER Award.

Leonard and Misha Collins, together with several other collaborators, are authors of "The 2D shape structure dataset", an article on a crowd-sourced database on the structure of shapes.

References

External links
 

21st-century women mathematicians
American computer scientists
American women mathematicians
California State University Channel Islands faculty
Living people
Year of birth missing (living people)
21st-century American women